Theotecnus was bishop of Caesarea Maritima in the late 3rd century.

References
 

3rd-century bishops in the Roman Empire
Bishops of Caesarea
4th-century bishops in the Roman Empire